Alberto Giraldo Jaramillo PSS (October 7, 1934 – July 21, 2021) was a Colombian Roman Catholic priest, prelate, and member of the Society of the Priests of Saint Sulpice. Giraldo served as the first Bishop of the Roman Catholic Diocese of Chiquinquirá from its creation on April 26, 1977, until July 26, 1983, and the Bishop of the Roman Catholic Diocese of Cúcuta from 1983 to 1990. He was then appointed Archbishop of the Roman Catholic Archdiocese of Popayán from 1990 to 1997 and Archbishop of the Roman Catholic Archdiocese of Medellín from February 1997 until his retirement in February 2010. He was also President of the Episcopal Conference of Colombia from July 1996 to July 2002. 

Giraldo was born in Manizales on October 7, 1934. He was ordained as a Catholic priest on November 9, 1958, and joined the Society of the Priests of Saint Sulpice in 1960. He studied theology at the University of Montreal in Canada and received a doctorate in theological studies from the Pontifical University of Saint Thomas Aquinas in Italy.

Giraldo was archbishop of Medellín from 1997 to 2010 during the height of the Colombian conflict. Alirio Uribe Muñoz, a human rights activist and politician, praised Giraldo as "committed 100% to peace and human rights in Medellin and Colombia" during the conflict.

Alberto Giraldo Jaramillo died at the San Jorge de Pereira Hospital in Pereira, Colombia, on July 21, 2021, at the age of 87.

References

1934 births
2021 deaths
Sulpician bishops
Roman Catholic archbishops of Medellín
Roman Catholic archbishops of Popayán
Colombian Roman Catholic archbishops
Colombian Roman Catholic bishops
Université de Montréal alumni
Pontifical University of Saint Thomas Aquinas alumni
People from Manizales